The Cerva CE.43 Guépard is a 1970s French four/five seat cabin monoplane produced by Cerva.

Design and development
The Cerva CE.43 Guépard (English: Cheetah) is an all-metal version of the Wassmer WA.4/21. The WA.4/21 prototype first flew in March 1967. Construction is a steel-tube with a fabric covered fuselage and plywood-covered wing. Wassmer decided to produce an alternate all-metal version and teamed up with Siren SA to form a joint-company known as Consortium Europeén de Réalisation et de Ventes d'Avions (CERVA). The two aircraft have identical dimensions but the all-metal Guépard is heavier.

The prototype Guépard was first flown on 18 May 1971 and was exhibited at the 1971 Paris Air Show. The aircraft was certified on 1 June 1972, and the French government ordered eight aircraft for the Service de la Formation Aéronautique (SFA), and 18 aircraft for use as communications aircraft by the Centre D'Essais en Vol (CEV) of the French Air Force. First deliveries to private customers began in 1975 and by the time production ended in 1976 44 aircraft had been produced with some being exported including to Finland.

Components for the Guépard were manufactured by Siren at Argenton-sur-Creuse and final assembly, equipment fit and flight testing was carried out by Wassmer at Issoire. Two new versions were developed, the CE.44 Couguar (English: Cougar) powered by a 285 hp (213 kW) Continental Tiara 6-285 engine, and the CE.45 Léopard powered by a 310 hp (231 kW) Avco Lycoming TIO-540. Development stopped when the Wassmer company went into liquidation in 1977.

Operators

 French Air Force (Centre D'Essais en Vol)
 French Navy

Specifications (CE.43 Guépard)

See also

References

External links

1970s French civil aircraft
1970s French military utility aircraft
Single-engined tractor aircraft
Low-wing aircraft
Aircraft first flown in 1971